The following is a list of characters in The Hunger Games novels, a series of young adult science fiction novels by Suzanne Collins whose original trilogy was later adapted into a series of four feature films. The actors who portray these characters are given in list of The Hunger Games cast members.

Katniss Everdeen 

Katniss Everdeen, known as "the girl on fire", is the main protagonist in the Hunger Games. She is 16 years old at the beginning of the first book and is quiet, independent, and fierce. She has long dark hair (hers is usually tied up in a braid), olive skin, and gray eyes, which are given as a characteristic of residents of the coal mining region of District 12 known as "the Seam". She was named for an aquatic plant with edible underwater tubers by her father, who jokingly said that “If you can find yourself, you’ll never be hungry.” She lives with her mother and younger sister, Primrose Everdeen (nicknamed "Prim"). Her father's death in a mining accident several years ago left her mother deeply depressed, forcing Katniss to become the mother figure and to use the hunting skills taught by her father to feed the family. Her favorite color is green, (as she told Peeta when he offered friendship to her) because of her familiarity with the forest. When Prim is "reaped" (chosen by lottery) as a "tribute" who must fight twenty-three other tributes to the death in the 74th Hunger Games, Katniss volunteers to take her place. She survives the game along with fellow tribute Peeta Mellark, who is in love with her. She "pretends" she loves him to survive. When the Gamemakers renege on a promise to let two surviving tributes from the same district live, she defies and embarrasses the government by threatening a double suicide with Peeta, becoming the personal enemy of Panem's leader, President Coriolanus Snow.

In the second installment Catching Fire, she is forced to fight in the next year's Hunger Games, an especially brutal edition known as the Quarter Quell which occurs every 25 years. While in the games she begins to realize her feelings for Peeta. She destroys the force field containing the Games arena and is rescued along with a few surviving tributes by members of an underground rebellion organized by the supposedly destroyed District 13. In the third installment, she is caught in a love triangle with Gale (her childhood friend) and Peeta. She becomes the Mockingjay, an inspirational symbol of a second civil war against the Capitol. Despite the intent of her limited role as a propagandist, she is drawn into combat by her obsession to kill Snow. As the war progresses, she comes to realize the rebel leader, President Alma Coin, is no less ruthless and power-driven than Snow. Katniss learns that Coin considers her expendable, staged a supposed Capitol atrocity which kills Prim, and after the war, calls for a final Hunger Games using the children of the Capitol war criminals. When finally given the chance to execute Snow, Katniss kills Coin instead. She is deemed not mentally responsible and returns to District 12, suffering trauma and suicidal depression. Peeta's return draws her out of the depression, and she finally realizes she is in love with him. She marries him, but it is fifteen years until she is ready to have children. When she does finally have children they are a girl and a boy, named Willow and Rye, respectively.

Peeta Mellark 

Peeta Mellark is a male tribute from District 12 in both the 74th and 75th Hunger Games. He is the same age as Katniss, with fair skin, blond hair, and blue eyes, characteristic of the town residents of District 12, whose middle-class merchants are slightly more well-to-do than those of the Seam. Peeta is the baker's son and lives with 2 older brothers, a quiet father, and a strict disciplinarian mother. Peeta's favorite color is orange. His skills include physical strength, personal charm and charisma, public speaking, baking, and painting. He is also known for his kindness and generosity. He is highly intelligent and is always thoughtful, balancing Katniss' impulsiveness. Peeta has been in love with Katniss ever since he first saw her during elementary school and declares his love for her during the pre-Games interview. Katniss believes this is a ploy to gain the support of sponsors to help them survive the Games. When they are young, Peeta saves Katniss and her family from starving to death by giving her bread, which he had accidentally burnt and his mother had beaten him for. Since then, he is known as the "boy with the bread" to Katniss. During the first game, he carefully comes up with a strategy to protect Katniss. As part of the strategy, he confesses his love for Katniss on TV in order to make her look desirable so she would have sponsors. Also, he decides to team up with the Careers and misleads them about Katniss. However, when the careers find this out, Peeta fights with them to save Katniss and is severely wounded.

In the Quarter Quell, he volunteers to replace Haymitch Abernathy as the male tribute from District 12, so that he can protect Katniss in the arena. The only time Katniss can sleep without nightmares relating back to the Games is when she is being held in Peeta's arms.

Peeta is captured by the Capitol at the end of the Quarter Quell and submitted to 'hijacking', a process of torture and brainwashing which gives him a fear of Katniss and effectively turns him into an assassination weapon against her. During the civil war, he is rescued and eventually rehabilitated by the rebels. After the Capitol is defeated, he returns to District 12 with Katniss and marries her. Fifteen years after the war, they have two children.

Gale Hawthorne 

Gale Hawthorne is a Seam resident boy who is two years older than Katniss and shares her hunting skill, dark hair, olive skin, and gray eyes. Through hunting, they have become best friends. Muscular and handsome, Gale has caught the attention of several girls in District 12. Gale lives with his mother Hazelle and his three younger siblings (Rory, Vick, and Posy) after his father's death in the same mining accident that killed Katniss' father. Being from the Seam, Gale shares a slight resemblance to Katniss. This allows the people of the Seam to cover for his close relationship with Katniss by saying they are cousins to hide the fact that the "star-crossed lovers" storyline with Peeta was staged, as it is presumed her closeness with someone as good looking as Gale would draw suspicion. Though their portrayal as cousins effectively satisfies the press from the Capitol, it makes both Katniss and Gale very uncomfortable on several occasions.

In the second book, Catching Fire, Katniss returns to District 12, but their relationship cannot continue as it was, since Katniss and Peeta must play the part of lovers due to threats from the Capitol. Gale confesses his love for Katniss after she asks him to run away with her. Soon afterward, he is brutally whipped in public for hunting on Capitol land. Katniss rescues him, getting whipped on the left cheek in doing so, and then takes care of him and they share a kiss. He and Katniss prepare to fight as it becomes clear that a rebellion is about to begin. However, Katniss, along with Peeta, is selected for the Third Quarter Quell and must leave District 12 to return to the Games. Once again, Gale is forced to say goodbye to Katniss as she prepares for a fight to the death. The book ends with Katniss waking up to see Gale's face. She is extremely confused, having been in the Hunger Games, and Gale tells her District 12 is no more.

In Mockingjay, Gale fights in the rebellion in an epic war. When District 12 was destroyed, Gale led approximately 10% of the population to safety. The survivors are forced to move to what is left of District 13. Once the people of District 13 are aware of Gale's heroism, they reward him with a higher ranking and a communicuff (which is later taken from him as punishment for helping Katniss). Towards the end of the book, his relationship with Katniss deteriorates because he feels responsible for the death of Prim, Katniss's sister (caused by a bomb he had constructed). He mentions that he would always remind Katniss of Prim's death, which Katniss silently agrees with. Afterwards, Gale decides to remain in District 2. Katniss hints of him having a girlfriend in District 2 and having moved on. It is possible that Gale and Katniss reconciled off-screen in the epilogue.

Haymitch Abernathy 

Haymitch Abernathy is a 'paunchy, alcohol-loving, handsome middle-aged man' who won the 50th Hunger Games (the Second Quarter Quell) 24 years before the events of the first book. He comes from The Seam and is described as having similar physical characteristics to Katniss and Gale: greyish hair and olive skin; in the Hunger Games movies, he is portrayed with blond straight hair and blue eyes. When he was 16, Haymitch was reaped for the Second Quarter Quell, wherein four, instead of the normal amount of two tributes from each district participated. He became an ally to a girl named Maysilee Donner, the original owner of Katniss's symbolic mockingjay pin, but was later forced to watch her die. During the Games, he discovered a cliff at the edge of the Arena that concealed a force field, which would ricochet anything thrown in its direction. During the final moments of the Games, a severely wounded Haymitch positioned himself by the edge of the force field to face his final opponent, a female tribute from District 1. Since she was a career tribute and stronger than Haymitch, she was favored to win the encounter. However, Haymitch's strategy was to wait for his opponent to fling her ax at him, then he would duck and the force field would hurl it back at her, burying it in her head. His plan was successful, leaving Haymitch the victor. Within two weeks of his victory, Haymitch's mother, younger brother, and girlfriend were all killed by President Snow as punishment for Haymitch using the force field to his advantage. Haymitch became an example of what happens to anyone who would defy the Capitol.

Following his victory, Haymitch became an alcoholic and has spent almost all of the next 24 years intoxicated. As the only surviving victor from District 12 (one of only two in the history of the Games), Haymitch has been forced to mentor all of its tributes, which consumed him with guilt by being obligated to participate in the Games that he hated. He stumbled through drunken fatalism and bemused curiosity all while teaching his new pupils his tricks. He dealt with these feelings with alcohol and by openly flouting the dignity of the games. He treats Peeta and Katniss with contempt, and initially is sarcastic, expending no effort to help them. However, when Katniss confronts him, he is stirred from his stupor and emerges as the pair's greatest advocate, impressed by her determination and Peeta's patience. Haymitch shows himself to be highly canny as he guides his protégés in a cleverly designed, highly unorthodox strategy aimed at ensuring the survival of both tributes.

In the book Catching Fire, the liquor supply in District 12 runs out. As a result, Haymitch suffers from alcohol withdrawal. It is left to Katniss and Peeta to coax him back to health and get him more liquor. After this incident, Katniss begins to develop a true affection and respect for him. When Katniss discovers Haymitch and his allies from District 13 and the Capitol failed to save Peeta from the arena as they did her, she claws him in the face. In Mockingjay, Haymitch is forced to go through detox in District 13, as they do not permit the consumption of alcohol. During the voting to decide whether the final Hunger Games will use the Capitol children, Haymitch votes yes, understanding Katniss's decision to make President Coin think she is on her side. After this, he continues to serve as a mentor to Katniss and Peeta. However, he never truly repairs his relationship with either of them and resumes his drinking after the war ends. Haymitch and Katniss, despite nearly always working towards the same goals, are usually hostile towards each other because they have similarly prickly personalities. Also, Katniss and Peeta both resent Haymitch for keeping information from both of them, sometimes at the request of the other.

Primrose Everdeen 

Primrose ("Prim") Everdeen is Katniss's younger sister. She is 12 years old in The Hunger Games, and has blonde hair and blue eyes. Kind and compassionate, Prim is a skilled healer, a pupil of her mother. In Mockingjay, Prim is chosen by District 13 to train as a doctor. The events of Catching Fire and Mockingjay force Prim to become more solemn and mature beyond her 13 years. Katniss states that Prim is "the only person I'm certain I love".

At the reaping for the 74th Hunger Games, Prim is chosen by lottery as the female "representative" of District 12. Katniss volunteers to, and takes her place. Before Katniss leaves for the Capitol, Prim makes her promise to try hard to win, and Katniss agrees. This promise guides many of Katniss's actions, and Katniss's sacrifice makes her symbolically popular in the Capitol, prompting Johanna to note that the Capitol cannot afford to threaten Prim to get to Katniss because of the potential outcry. In Mockingjay, rebel president Coin sends Prim as a casualty nurse into the final battle against the Capitol, where she is killed in a bombing, which sends Katniss into deep depression and resulting in the momentary loss of her voice. President Snow tells Katniss the rebels were in fact behind the bombing and made it resemble the work of the Capitol, and timed a second explosion to kill the medical corps assisting the first round of survivors. This leads Katniss to kill Coin instead of Snow.

Coriolanus Snow 

President Coriolanus Snow is the main antagonist of the series. He is the autocratic ruler of the Capitol and all of Panem. Though seemingly laid-back, his demeanor hides a sadistic and psychopathic mind. He initially appears in The Hunger Games giving the official welcome at the opening of the Games, but he does not speak to Katniss face-to-face until Catching Fire, when he pays her a visit at home and tells her he is angry that both she and Peeta were allowed to survive the Hunger Games, because their act of defiance (preferring joint suicide to the prospect of one killing the other) has ignited rebellion in several of the Districts. She is too prominent to kill, but he threatens her family and Gale unless she proves to the Districts that her act of saving Peeta was merely that of a love-crazed teenager and was not related to any desire to defy the Capitol. Later, Snow indicates to her that she failed in this, meaning that some or all of his threats will come true. President Snow is described as having very puffy lips, which are most likely the result of an appearance-altering operation that is very popular in the Capitol. Katniss describes him as exuding a smell of blood and roses.

In Mockingjay, it is revealed that the smell of blood is due to oral sores he incurred from one of the poisons that he used to kill people in his megalomaniacal efforts to control Panem. He drank the poison in order to allay suspicions, then took the antidote, but resulted in bloody sores in his mouth. He also smells strongly of genetically enhanced roses, as he always wears a white rose in his lapel to cover the scent of blood. The strong smell invariably makes Katniss gag. He is said to have prostituted winning tributes, like Finnick Odair, forcing them to have sex with wealthy Capitol citizens, under threat of killing their loved ones if they refused. Snow claims he only kills for a purpose, and he promises Katniss he will always tell her the truth. Whether these assertions are true or not is left up to interpretation by Katniss. He dies at the end of Mockingjay, after Katniss shoots President Coin instead of him at his own public execution, and he laughs maniacally at the irony of said assassination. The rebels are unable to determine whether the cause of death was by choking on his own blood from his untreated mouth sores or because he was trampled by the mob in the panic following President Coin's assassination.

Coriolanus "Coryo" Snow is the main character of The Ballad of Songbirds and Snakes, which is set when he is aged 18. Having been orphaned during the war, he lives with his grandmother and his cousin Tigris. His family was once rich but had lost a lot of their wealth in the war, mainly due to their factory in District 13 being destroyed. He is assigned to mentor the female tribute from District 12, Lucy Gray Baird. In the leadup to the Hunger Games, they develop feelings for each other, culminating in a goodbye kiss before she enters the arena. Before and during the Hunger Games, the head gamemaker, Dr. Gaul, takes a personal interest in his education and assigns him to write a number of essays. On the first night of the Games, his friend Sejanus Plinth infiltrates the arena to administer funeral rites to a tribute, and Dr. Gaul forces Coriolanus to enter the arena and bring him out. They are attacked by a number of tributes, one of whom Coriolanus kills in self-defense. Dr. Gaul reveals that this was to educate him about the violence humans were capable of.

Lucy Gray wins the games, in part, due to illicit assistance she receives from Snow: he helps her smuggle food into the arena, as well as a make-up compact filled with rat poison, which she uses to kill two other tributes. He also introduces her scent to the snake mutations, which he suspects will be deployed in the arena as they are trained to only attack those with unfamiliar scents. As punishment for their indiscretions, he and Sejanus are sent to District 12 to serve as Peacekeepers. Coriolanus reunites with Lucy Gray and they begin a relationship. The two of them get caught up in a rebel plot which Sejanus is part of, and Coriolanus is forced to kill the Mayor's daughter, Mayfair Lipp, Lucy Gray's former romantic rival who it is suggested had manipulated Lucy's selection at the reaping, so she does not report them to the authorities. Coriolanus reports the plot to the Capitol, for which Sejanus is hanged. Certain that his part in the scheme will be exposed, and with Mayor Lipp increasingly harassing Lucy Gray, who he suspects for the murder of his daughter, the two of them run away from District 12 together. However, Lucy Gray realises Snow's part in the death of Sejanus, and - deciding he cannot be trusted - leaves him. Coriolanus follows her, only to walk into a trap she had laid for him. He returns to the place they parted, and hearing her singing nearby, shoots a volley of bullets in all directions. She is not seen again after this, although it is unclear whether she was killed by Snow, or she ran away and managed to survive somehow. Snow returns to District 12, and finds out he has been selected for officer training. He is placed on a hovercraft, ostensibly bound for an officer training school, only to find himself back in the Capitol. Dr. Gaul says that she had arranged for his assignment as a Peacekeeper, with the intent that it would be temporary and educational. He is effectively adopted by Sejanus's wealthy father Strabo, who is unaware of the role he played in Sejanus's death and pays for Coriolanus's university fees. While at university, he interns as a gamemaker under Dr. Gaul and is set to inherit the Plinth fortune.

A number of features of the Hunger Games shown in the trilogy are revealed to be invented by Snow, either as a mentor or a gamemaker, namely the sponsoring of and betting on tributes, the Victors' Village, the Games being compulsory viewing, and payments for a victor's district. The Games themselves were revealed to have been a co-creation of his father, Crassus Snow, and his best friend Casca Highbottom. Casca and Crassus had fallen out after developing the idea of the Hunger Games as Highbottom had thought it an academic exercise and been horrified at the thought of it becoming reality.  Later, Casca, recognizing several similarities between Crassus and his son transferred this grudge to Coriolanus.  Coriolanus' liking of the smell of roses is also explained: his family grew them on the roof of their house, and his mother used rose-scented cosmetic powder. The Ballad of Songbirds and Snakes also sees Coriolanus begin the practice of poisoning people: initially indirectly through Lucy Gray, but later directly, when he poisons Casca Highbottom as revenge for mistreating him while serving as dean of his school.

10th Hunger Games tributes

Lucy Gray Baird 
Lucy Gray Baird is the District 12 female tribute and victor of the 10th Hunger Games. She was not born in District 12 but was a member of the Covey, a group of travelling musicians. Following the war, the Covey were forced to settle down in districts. Before the reaping, Lucy Gray was in a relationship with fellow Covey member Billy Taupe, who was also seeing the mayor's daughter, Mayfair Lipp. Both girls discover this, and Lucy Gray believes that Mayfair arranged for her to be reaped. Coriolanus Snow is assigned to be her mentor, and they develop mutual feelings. She dazzles audiences with her charisma and singing ability and has a penchant for snake charming. Coriolanus provides her with a compact to collect rat poison into the Games and familiarizes the snake mutations with her smell so they will not attack her. During the games, she poisons Wovey and Reaper, and is able to collect the snake mutations, using one to kill Treech. However, due to the illicit assistance she received, she receives very little publicity afterwards. 

She is reunited with Coriolanus after he is assigned to District 12 as a Peacekeeper. She is the writer of the song "The Hanging Tree". After Mayfair is killed by Coriolanus, the mayor becomes determined to arrest Lucy Gray for her murder, so she and Coriolanus leave District 12, only for Lucy Gray to realize his role in the death of Sejanus Plinth. Deciding that he is untrustworthy, she flees and leaves a trap. Coriolanus shoots a rifle in Lucy Gray's direction and she is not seen again afterwards, but her fate is left uncertain. In The Hunger Games, she is indirectly stated to be dead, as Haymitch Abernathy is the only surviving District 12 victor at that point.

Jessup Diggs 
Jessup Diggs is the District 12 male tribute in the 10th Hunger Games. He contracts rabies before the Games begins - it is later suggested this may have been from a raccoon or rat bite. He initially forms an alliance with his district partner, Lucy Gray, only to develop rabies symptoms and start chasing her. He falls to his death during the chase. His assigned mentor is Lysistrata Vickers.

Minor 10th Hunger Games tributes 
 Facet is the District 1 male tribute in the 10th Hunger Games. Along with Velvereen, he is shot down by Peacekeepers while trying to escape the arena after the bombing. His assigned mentor is Livia Cardew.
 Velvereen is the District 1 female tribute in the 10th Hunger Games. Along with Facet, she is shot down by Peacekeepers while trying to escape the arena after the bombing. Her assigned mentor is Palmyra Monty.
 Marcus is the District 2 male tribute in the 10th Hunger Games. He is a former classmate of his mentor, Sejanus Plinth. When the tributes and mentors are being shown through the arena, a bombing attack opens up an exit, and he escapes, hiding in the sewers. He is later recaptured and badly beaten. At the start of the Hunger Games, he is strung from his wrists to a crossbar. Lamina kills him shortly after the games begin.
 Sabyn is the District 2 female tribute in the 10th Hunger Games. She leaps over a wall, while trying to escape the arena after the bombing, but falls to her death. Her assigned mentor is Florus Friend.
 Circ is the District 3 male tribute in the 10th Hunger Games. He and Teslee capture a broken drone to redesign it as a weapon, but he is killed by mutated snakes before they can use it. His assigned mentor is Io Jasper.
 Teslee is the District 3 female tribute in the 10th Hunger Games. She and Circ capture a broken drone and redesign it. She survives until fourth to last, then is killed by Treech sneaking up with an axe. Her assigned mentor is Urban Canville.
 Mizzen is the District 4 male tribute in the 10th Hunger Games. He forms an alliance with the Tanner and Coral. They betray Tanner, and Coral kills Tanner. Before they broke the alliance Coral killed Sol and Lamina along with help from Mizzen and Tanner. While he was being chased by reprogrammed drones, made by the district 3 tribute Teslee, he puts pressure on his bad knee that Lamina had injured, which made him fall and snap his neck. His assigned mentor is Persephone Price. He’s described as a strong tribute, of medium to tall height, with tanned skin. And he is also known to have brown, curly hair.
 Coral is the District 4 female tribute in the 10th Hunger Games. She forms an alliance with the Tanner and Mizzen, only to betray and kill Tanner. Before they broke the alliance, Coral killed Sol and Lamina along with help from Mizzen and Tanner. She is the second tribute to be killed by mutation snakes. Her assigned mentor is Festus Creed. She is known to have long, red hair.
 Hy is the District 5 male tribute in the 10th Hunger Games. He dies due to an asthma attack immediately before the games begin. His assigned mentor is Dennis Fling.
 Sol is the District 5 female tribute in the 10th Hunger Games. She is killed with a trident by Coral, with help from Mizzen and Tanner. Her assigned mentor is Iphigenia Moss.
 Otto is the District 6 male tribute in the 10th Hunger Games. He and Ginnee are both killed in the bombing attack. His assigned mentor is Apollo Ring.
 Ginnee is the District 6 female tribute in the 10th Hunger Games. She and Otto are both killed in the bombing attack. Her assigned mentor is Diana Ring.
 Treech is the District 7 male tribute in the 10th Hunger Games. His assigned mentor is Vipsania Sickle. He is killed by Lucy Grey Baird with a mutation snake. He survived longer than anyone but Lucy Grey and Reaper Ash.
 Lamina is the District 7 female tribute in the 10th Hunger Games. She spends the majority of the games, while she lives, sheltering on top of the crossbeam Marcus was hanging from. She kills Marcus with her axe, and then is eventually killed by Coral with help from Mizzen and Tanner. Her assigned mentor is Pliny Harrington.
 Bobbin is the District 8 male tribute in the 10th Hunger Games. His assigned mentor is Juno Phipps. He was killed by Coriolanus Snow when Snow was sent to retrieve Sejanus Plinth from the arena.
 Wovey is the District 8 female tribute in the 10th Hunger Games. She dies from drinking a water bottle that Lucy Gray had poisoned. Her assigned mentor is Hilarius Heavensbee.
 Panlo is the District 9 male tribute in the 10th Hunger Games. He and Sheaf die from injuries sustained in the bombing attack. His assigned mentor is Gaius Breen.
 Sheaf is the District 9 female tribute in the 10th Hunger Games. She and Panlo die from injuries sustained in the bombing attack. Her assigned mentor is Androcles Anderson.
 Tanner is the District 10 male tribute in the 10th Hunger Games. He forms an alliance with the District 4 tributes, only to be betrayed, and killed by Coral. Before he was killed they worked together to kill Sol and Lamina. His assigned mentor is Domitia Whimsiwick.
 Brandy is the District 10 female tribute in the 10th Hunger Games. She is shot dead by peacekeepers after murdering her mentor, Arachne Crane.
 Reaper Ash is the District 11 male tribute in the 10th Hunger Games. He killed a peacekeeper sometime before the reaping, and attacks Coriolanus on his arrival in the Capitol. He chases Lucy Gray, which forces him to drink from a puddle of water that Lucy had poisoned, he soon dies, leaving Lucy Gray the victor of the 10th hunger games. His assigned mentor is Clemensia Dovecote.
 Dill is the District 11 female tribute in the 10th Hunger Games. She dies early in the Games from tuberculosis. Her assigned mentor is Felix Ravinstill.

74th Hunger Games tributes

Marvel 
Marvel is the District 1 male tribute in the 74th Hunger Games. Marvel was a Career tribute and was very skilled at throwing spears. He scored a 9 in his private session, a score considered low for a Career. Marvel played a strong part in the initial bloodbath, killing off many of the 13 tributes that died in the first 8 hours. He then took part in the hunt for Katniss during the Games, along with the other career tributes and Peeta. When the careers were attacked by the tracker jacker nest, he survived as the sole District 1 tribute. Marvel survived through to the final eight tributes but was then shot in his neck by Katniss (or in the film, his stomach), in self-defense, after he had fatally speared Rue, Katniss' ally. The arrow to his neck caused Marvel to drown in his own blood, halving the time of his suffering. He finished 8th overall.

Glimmer 
Glimmer is the District 1 female tribute in the 74th Hunger Games. She was a career tribute. She chose to use bow and arrows as her weapons during the bloodbath, but it is later revealed that she was incompetent at shooting. Glimmer was later indirectly killed by Katniss after she dropped a tracker jacker nest on the career tributes along with the District 4 female tribute (book). After her death, Katniss managed to steal her bow and arrows from her 'dismembered body'. Katniss had to break several of her bloated fingers to retrieve the bow from her. Glimmer finished 12th overall. Her death was described as extremely disgusting. In the movie, she was seen flirting with Cato during the games but Cato left her to die when she was attacked by tracker jackers.

Cato 
Cato is the District 2 male tribute in the 74th Hunger Games. He was the leader of the Career pack and tall, good-looking, the second-largest/physically-strongest tribute, being only slightly smaller than Thresh, the District 11 male tribute. He was the only tribute in the 74th Hunger Games, aside from Katniss, who is confirmed to have volunteered for the Games. Cato was skilled with many weapons and proved this by scoring a 10 in his private session, earning many sponsors in the process. Cato played a strong part in the initial bloodbath, killing off many tributes, one being the District 4 male. He then took part in the hunt for Katniss during the Games, along with the other career tributes and Peeta. He managed to escape the attack of the tracker jackers, caused by Katniss while they were sleeping. 

Cato made it through to the final six and was absent from the feast, as Clove had gone to the Cornucopia herself and fought with Katniss. Cato presumably killed Thresh (book) and outfoxed Foxface to make the final three. At this point, game makers sent in mutations representing the dead tributes (book) and dogs (movie) which drove Katniss, Peeta, and Cato to the cornucopia, where Cato is seen to have received full body armour. Cato captured Peeta but Katniss shoots him in the hand, forcing him to release Peeta and fall off of the cornucopia. There the dogs maul him before Katniss mercifully kills him with an arrow. He finished 3rd overall.

Clove 
Clove is the District 2 female tribute in the 74th Hunger Games. She was said to have dark hair. Clove was a member of the career pack and an expert knife-thrower. She scored a 10 in her private session, common for a career tribute. In the initial bloodbath, she was the first tribute who came close to killing Katniss. She killed the District 9 male, who was about to kill Katniss, and then threw a knife at Katniss, who blocked it with her backpack. She then chased Katniss away into the forest. Clove took part in the hunt for Katniss during the games, along with the career tributes and Peeta because Katniss beat her in the private session. Once they found Katniss, they chased her up a tree and trapped her by sleeping on the ground beneath her. Clove then survived the attack of the tracker jackers, caused by Katniss. Katniss then further weakened the careers, when she destroyed their supplies. Clove and Katniss then came into contact at the feast, where Clove attacked her with a knife, pinned her down, and taunted her about Rue's death. Clove was about to kill Katniss but is then attacked by Thresh, who had witnessed the whole fight. Clove's death is slightly different in the book and the film: in the book Thresh smashed her head with a rock, cracking her skull, but in the film, he violently and lethally slams her against the Cornucopia. She finished 6th overall.

Finch AKA Foxface 
Foxface is the District 5 female tribute in the 74th Hunger Games. Her real name is revealed in the movie as Finch; Katniss gives her the nickname Foxface. She scored a 5 during her private session and survived the initial bloodbath. She was next seen by Katniss as she stole food from the career tributes' mountain of supplies. She then took part in the feast, in which she remained hidden in the Cornucopia, escaping with her district bag. She made it through to the final 5 tributes but died after eating poisonous nightlock berries. She finished 4th overall in the book (5th in the film).

Thresh 
Thresh is the District 11 male tribute in the 74th Hunger Games. He was the physically strongest and largest tribute, which lent him an advantage in the Games, and one of the oldest contenders. He scored a 10 in his private session, which proved he was as strong as the career tributes. He survived the initial bloodbath and even killed one of the tributes himself. During the games, he stayed hidden away from all the other tributes, which helped him survive through to the final six. When the feast was announced, he made his way to the Cornucopia and witnessed Clove attack Katniss. He then brutally killed Clove, upon hearing her say that she killed Rue, his female counterpart. He spared Katniss's life as she was Rue's ally. His death in the book is very different from that in the film: in the book, he is presumably killed by Cato and finishes fifth overall. However, in the film, he is the first victim of the Mutts and finishes fourth overall.

Rue 
Rue is the District 11 female tribute in the 74th Hunger Games. She was the youngest of all the tributes in the Games, at just 12 years old. She scored a 7 in her private session which was unusually high for such a young tribute and survived the initial bloodbath. She spent the first few days climbing through the trees and hiding. On Day 5, she found Katniss up a tree, trapped there by the career tributes. She pointed out a tracker jacker nest to Katniss. Katniss planned to drop the nest on the careers and cut the branch it was hanging under, which caused it to fall on the careers. This resulted in the deaths of Glimmer (and the female tribute from District 4 in the book). Katniss then collapsed, having been stung by some of the tracker jackers, and slept for a few days. Rue tended to her jacket stings during this time, stating that it was "lucky that she had the sense to pull out the stingers, otherwise she would have been a lot worse".

Upon her awakening, Katniss and Rue became allies and made plans to destroy the careers' supplies. Katniss destroyed the supply mountain the next day, shooting a sack of apples that, upon landing, set off the pedestal mines that the boy from District 3 had reactivated, but Rue found herself trapped in a net set up by the Careers. Katniss came to her rescue, but, while dodging her own death, Marvel speared Rue in the abdomen. In the ensuing conflict, Marvel was killed by Katniss, who was trying to defend Rue. The dying Rue told Katniss she had to win and asked her to sing for her as she died. Rue finished seventh overall. Rue had five brothers and sisters, and her father died when she was 9. She was evidently close to her siblings and had some hunting skills, even though the only weapons she had were a slingshot and a rock for a knife. Rue is often mentioned by Katniss in the later books as they were not only allies but friends as well.

75th Hunger Games tributes

Finnick Odair 
Finnick Odair is the male tribute from District 4 who was reaped into the Third Quarter Quell. He was 24 years old and described as being very handsome, muscular, athletic, and tall with tan skin, bronze hair, and stunning sea-green eyes. He was very popular among the people of the Capitol, both because he was a victorious Career tribute and a sex symbol, known for having many lovers in the Capitol, none of whom he stayed with for long. At age 14, he won the 65th Hunger Games by using a trident and a net against other tributes (a skill unique to District 4's trade of fishing). Katniss remarks that the trident given to him by a sponsor may have been the most expensive gift ever seen in the Games. During the Quarter Quell, Katniss is hesitant to make Finnick her ally, because she does not trust him—to her, he appears to be shallow, arrogant, and superficial. However, Finnick soon proved to be trustworthy by saving Peeta by using CPR to resuscitate him (which Katniss notes as, "one of the things I will never stop owing him for"), and using his skills to provide shelter. 

When jabberjays that make sounds of the screams of loved ones being tortured appear in the Quell, the one made to target Finnick used the voice of Annie Cresta, his "poor, mad" lover in District 4, who was also a victor of the Games. In Mockingjay, Finnick entered a deep depression, a result of Annie's being held prisoner by the Capitol, and formed a close bond with Katniss over their mutual pain and experiences. He assisted with the rebellion by appearing in rebel propaganda. He later revealed that victors of the Games are often prostituted to wealthy citizens of the Capitol by President Snow, which resulted in Finnick's reputation for having many lovers. He also revealed all of the political secrets he learned from clients, including the fact that President Snow only became the leader of Panem by poisoning his opponents. Finnick was reunited with Annie (when District 13 retrieved her, Johanna, and Peeta from the Capitol), and they married. 

Finnick was a member of the "Star Squad" that went to fight in the Capitol during the final stages of the rebellion. He and Katniss fought off lizard mutations (or "mutts") during the attempt to infiltrate the Capitol, with Finnick holding them off for Katniss to escape but being dragged back by them before he can escape himself. Katniss says "Nightlock" three times into the Holo, causing it to explode, allowing Finnick to die quickly and painlessly. In the novel, however, Finnick is decapitated by the mutts. Katniss sees moments from Finnick's life pass before her eyes as he dies. Some months after his death, Annie has their son. Finnick and Katniss grew very close in Catching Fire, and he was Katniss's best friend throughout the last novel, being one of the only people who understood what she was going through.

Beetee Latier 
Beetee Latier is the District 3 male in the 75th Hunger Games. He was skilled in electronics and won his game by electrocuting groups of tributes at once. Beetee also contributed substantially to the technology of the Capitol. He joined the alliance to protect Katniss and devised a plan to electrocute the careers. Although injured, he survived the game and was brought by the rebels to District 13. Beetee joined the district's technology division, working on the military equipment and designing a bomb that President Coin later used to bomb the Capitol children and medics, killing Prim.

Mags 
Mags is the District 4 female in the 75th Hunger Games. She was the oldest tribute, about 80 years old, and had won the 11th Hunger Games. Mags was frail and spoke fragmented words that Katniss did not understand, though Katniss did understand her body language (in the movie, this is all changed to her being a mute). Mags knew she could not survive the game due to her age and frailty, but volunteered as tribute to spare Annie Cresta, Finnick Odair's girlfriend. Mags was skilled at weaving and could make a fishing hook "out of anything". During the game, Mags sacrificed herself to a poisonous fog so she would not slow down Katniss, Peeta, and Finnick. She finished 15th overall.

Johanna Mason 
Johanna Mason is the female tribute from District 7. She won the 71st Hunger Games by pretending she was a weakling and a coward, so no one regarded her as a threat, but when only a few tributes remained, she revealed herself to be a vicious killer. Haymitch implies that she may have been prostituted by President Snow, as Finnick was, but it is also implied that she refused to be prostituted, causing the Capitol to kill her family and friends. She does not consider Snow a threat: "He can't hurt me. There is no one left I love." Sarcastic and rebellious, Johanna's first meeting with Katniss involves her stripping naked out of her tree costume in order to make Katniss uncomfortable. She openly defies and defames the Capitol at every opportunity, but the Capitol usually ignores her, since they had already eliminated those she loved. Johanna teams up with Katniss, Peeta, and Finnick in the Quarter Quell, bringing Beetee and Wiress with her. Johanna takes part in the committee to keep Katniss and Peeta alive and helps by protecting Katniss throughout the Games. Near the end of Catching Fire, she removes the tracker in Katniss's arm by cutting it out with a knife. Johanna is captured by the Capitol at the end of Catching Fire. 

In the third book, she is rescued, along with Peeta and Annie, and brought to District 13 where she fights with rebel forces and improves her friendship with Katniss. She is to fight in the Capitol with Katniss (although not as a sharpshooter—being from an area where lumber is the main export, her main weapon is the axe) but during training in District 13, she panics when the training arena is deliberately flooded, as she has developed a fear of water as a result of her Capitol torture (being soaked in water, given electric shocks and shaved bald). Because she and Katniss refuse to be held in the District 13 hospital to treat their supposed mental illnesses, they convince the officials of District 13 to let them room together. Johanna is part of the committee that votes whether to hold one last Hunger Games using the Capitol's children. She votes yes. She was locked up with Peeta Mellark in the capitol.

Enobaria 
Enobaria is the District 2 female tribute in the 75th Hunger Games. She was a career tribute specializing in the use of swords and the victor of the 62nd Hunger Games. During her games, she bit another tribute's throat to secure her victory. To remind people of her savage victory, she had her teeth filed into fangs and inlaid with gold, which made her extremely popular with the people of the Capitol. Enobaria was the only non-alliance tribute who survived the Third Quarter Quell; she was taken hostage by the Capitol alongside Peeta and Johanna. She was not among the victors rescued by District 13, though Boggs, who led the mission speculated that being from District 2, she may not have been being held anyway, and Katniss thought Enobaria was probably not tortured. Although the book states that Victors were targeted by both sides during the war due to distrust about their loyalties, Enobaria was the only non-rebel victor to have escaped death to the end. In the voting to decide the final Hunger Games with the Capitol children, Enobaria voted yes, stating: "Let them [the Capitol] taste their own medicine". Nevertheless, her inclusion among them seemed out of place to Johanna Mason who threatened to kill her anyway. In the final two film adaptations, Enobaria is neither mentioned as having been captured by the Capitol nor shown rescued alongside the other tributes but later turns up anyway, in the voting to decide the final Hunger Games as well as during the execution of President Snow.

Other 75th Hunger Games Tributes 
Gloss is the District 1 male tribute in the 75th Hunger Games and Cashmere's brother. He was a career tribute specializing in the use of daggers and the victor of the 63rd Hunger Games. In the book, Katniss shot him with an arrow in the right temple. In the film, Katniss shoots an arrow piercing the direct center of his bare chest, killing him instantly. He finished 11th overall.
Cashmere is the District 1 female tribute in the 75th Hunger Games. She was a career tribute specializing in the use of knives and the victor of the 64th Hunger Games. In the film, she is shown to be very beautiful and close to her brother Gloss. Johanna Mason killed her by throwing an axe into her chest. Cashmere finished 10th overall. In Mockingjay, Finnick implies that she was prostituted by the Capitol, just as he had been.
Brutus is the District 2 male tribute in the 75th Hunger Games. He was a career tribute and the victor of the 46th Hunger Games. In the film, he is shown to be bald, extremely muscular, bare-chested, and very skilled with spears. He was the last tribute to die in the Third Quarter Quell as well as the entire history of the Hunger Games. Peeta killed him after Brutus killed Chaff. Brutus finished 7th overall. This wasn't confirmed until Peeta mentioned his killing of Brutus in an interview with Caesar Flickerman in the third film.
Wiress is the District 3 female in the 75th Hunger Games. She had a habit of not finishing her sentences, forcing Beetee to finish them on her behalf. She was tech-savvy and communicated to Katniss the arena of the Third Quarter Quell was designed and functioned as a clock. After Blight's death, Wiress became mentally unstable. When the careers caught up with the alliance, Gloss slit Wiress's throat. Wiress finished 12th overall.
An unidentified female Morphling is the District 6 female in the 75th Hunger Games. She sacrificed herself by jumping in front of a monkey mutt before it could kill Peeta, who afterward comforted her in the book, by telling her stories about colors and letting her paint a flower on his face with her blood, and in the film by having her admire the sky. She finished 14th overall.
Blight is the District 7 male in the 75th Hunger Games. He protested his inclusion by not joining the Training Period. He formed an alliance with his fellow tribute, Johanna, and with Beetee and Wiress, but ran into a force field during a blood rain, which stopped his heart. Johanna stated: "he's not much, but he was from home".
Woof is the District 8 male in the 75th Hunger Games. He is the second oldest living tribute, about 70 years old. He is forgetful and eats insects even after being told they are poisonous. He is killed in the bloodbath.
Cecelia is the District 8 female in the 75th Hunger Games. She had three children who begged her not to enter the Hunger Games, as seen in the footage of the Reaping. Katniss chose her as one of her allies in the arena, but Cecelia was killed in the bloodbath.
Chaff is the District 11 male in the 75th Hunger Games. He was the victor of the 45th Hunger Games and refused a prosthetic arm after losing it. Chaff was best friends with Haymitch, and they frequently drank together. He kisses Katniss during their first meeting, without warning, to tease her. He is killed by Brutus on the final day of the game, finishing 8th overall.
Seeder is the District 11 female in the 75th Hunger Games. She had dark hair and olive skin, which made her look like a person from The Seam if not for her golden eyes. She embraced Katniss after the chariot rides, assuring Katniss that Rue and Thresh's families were safe after the commotion in District 11. Katniss chose her as one of her allies in the arena, but she was killed in the bloodbath.

Tributes from Other Games

Annie Cresta 
Annie Cresta competed in and won the 70th Hunger Games, representing District 4. She has sea-green eyes and dark hair. She became mentally unstable after seeing the male tribute from her district decapitated. When an earthquake broke a dam, the arena was flooded. She won because, being from the fishing district, she was the best swimmer. Annie seems never to have fully recovered and is seen to be driven mad. Despite this, she is a kind person. She is chosen at the reaping for the Quarter Quell, but Mags volunteers to take her place, to spare her. Her scream is used by the jabberjays (birds that can mimic whatever they hear) in the Quarter Quell to torment Finnick Odair, who loves her. In Mockingjay, she and Finnick marry, and she gives birth to their son after his death. Annie votes against another Hunger Games for Capitol children, noting that, if alive, Finnick would do the same.

Maysilee Donner 
Maysilee Donner is Madge's aunt, and was reaped along with Haymitch and two others for the 50th Hunger Games, and temporarily became Haymitch's ally. She and Katniss's mother were friends. She teams up with Haymitch after saving him from a fight against 3 other tributes using poisonous darts. After breaking the alliance with Haymitch, Maysilee is killed by a large number of bright, "candy-pink birds", who use their razor sharp beaks to fatally wound her in the neck. Haymitch stays with her until she dies, as Katniss stayed with Rue until she died. The mockingjay pin Madge gave Katniss belonged to Maysilee.

Titus 
Titus was a male tribute from District 6 who competed in an unspecified Hunger Game. The Arena of that game was a frozen tundra, and the tributes were constantly in dire need of food. Titus became a cannibal by eating the corpses of dead tributes. He was eventually killed by an avalanche, and since then, there is an unspoken rule for the tributes not to eat other tributes. Katniss speculates the Capitol staged his death to prevent a mad cannibal from winning the game.

The Capitol

Effie Trinket 
Effie Trinket is a Capitol-born chaperone who was assigned to oversee District 12's tributes in the Hunger Games, specifically Katniss and Peeta in the 74th and 75th Games. She must carry out such tasks as drawing the tributes' names at the reaping and escorting them to the Capitol. At first, she detests her association with District 12 and hopes to be promoted to a better, richer district after she pays her dues for a few years. Later, Effie becomes attached to her District 12 charges. She has no moral qualms about the Hunger Games or the Capitol and appears oblivious to the misfortunes of District 12. She does not appear to be very intelligent and gets basic facts wrong, such as confusing how diamonds and pearls are made. Effie wears wigs of different colors for various special occasions, is very strict about manners, and is always punctual. Katniss notes in the first book that "although she can be tiresome, Effie has a very keen instinct about certain things" and "a certain determination I admire". Effie's catchphrase in the first book is "Happy Hunger Games, and may the odds be ever in your favor!" 

In Mockingjay, it is said she was imprisoned after Katniss’s escape but unlike many others Katniss knew in the Capitol, she is not executed. She meets up again with Katniss before Snow's execution, and Katniss notes that she now has a "vacant look" in her eyes. The book states Haymitch and Plutarch had some difficulty in keeping her from being executed at the end of the war, but her imprisonment had actually helped in that regard. In the films, Effie's role in the third film, Mockingjay Part 1, is expanded as, rather than getting captured by the Capitol, she is instead evacuated against her will by the Rebels and taken to District 13. Though initially hesitant, she eventually consents to help Katniss and effectively replaces the role of Katniss's prep team, who does not appear beyond the second film.

Cinna 
Cinna is Katniss' stylist, responsible for her public appearances. After designing the spectacular outfits for the opening ceremony, which include costumes ignitable with synthetic fire, he nicknames Katniss "the Girl on Fire". Cinna is in his first year as a stylist for the Games and specifically requested to be assigned to District 12. His amazing designs immediately win over the audience in favor of the District 12 tributes. Cinna is better than most at seeing through the superficiality and spectacle of the Games to their barbaric core. Cinna’s role was also to support and calm Katniss down before entering the arena. Although he did this very subtly, he had a unique nonverbal connection, which gave Katniss much strength. He and Katniss establish an easy, comfortable relationship, and he demonstrates a genuine concern for her well-being.

In Catching Fire, Cinna dresses Katniss for her television interview in her wedding dress, as insisted by President Snow, but alters it so that when Katniss raises her arms and twirls, the white dress burns away to be replaced with a black and grey dress of feathers that resembles a mockingjay, which has become the symbol of the resistance in Panem. Because of this, Cinna is savagely beaten in front of Katniss, right before she enters the arena for the Quarter Quell, which unnerves her greatly. It is suggested that he might have been tortured to death after the arena explodes. Effie Trinket states in Mockingjay, Part 1, before showing Katniss sketches of her Mockingjay costume made by Cinna, that he is dead. Cinna is very different from the other inhabitants of the Capitol. He does not use surgery to alter his features, wears simple black clothes, and leaves his hair its natural dark brown color, close-cropped. His only concession to the Capitol's fashion style is a small amount of metallic gold eyeliner, applied with a light hand, that brings out the gold flecks in his green eyes. In Mockingjay he is confirmed as one of the rebels.

Plutarch Heavensbee 
Plutarch Heavensbee is the new Head Gamemaker following the death of Seneca Crane. He is actually the judge who falls into the punch bowl when Katniss shoots the apple out of a pig's mouth during her scoring in the first book, but Katniss does not formally meet him until the Victory Tour celebration in the second book. He is later shown to be the leader of the rebellion movement in the Districts and is the mastermind behind the plan to break the tributes out of the arena in Catching Fire. He tries to give Katniss hints about the nature of the arena for the Quarter Quell, but Katniss does not pick up on it until much later. In Mockingjay he has become a "rebel filmmaker", and helps create propaganda featuring Katniss as the Mockingjay for District 13's war against the Capitol. He is elected Secretary of Communications after the war ends.

Seneca Crane 
Seneca Crane is the Head Gamemaker during the 74th Hunger Games. Near the beginning of the Catching Fire book, Snow tells Katniss that he had him executed for letting both her and Peeta live. At the end of the first Hunger Games movie, Crane is shown being escorted by Capitol guards and locked in a room containing poisonous nightlock berries to consume. In both the Catching Fire book and movie, Katniss hangs a dummy with the words "Seneca Crane" on it before the judges when her skills test is performed, shocking the judges greatly.

Prep team 
Octavia, Venia, and Flavius are Katniss's prep team. They are residents of the Capitol and sport the radically altered appearances typical of Capitol residents, including pea-green skin (Octavia), aqua-colored hair and a face etched with gold tattoos (Venia), and orange corkscrew hair and purple lipstick (Flavius). At first, it appears they are dull-witted and care only about their appearance. However, they prove themselves less shallow when they begin to cry while preparing Katniss for the Quarter Quell, from which they do not expect her to return. Katniss gleans valuable information from them by listening to them gossip about shortages of supplies, giving Katniss clues about which districts have rebelled. In Mockingjay, they are kidnapped and taken to District 13 to help with Katniss's styling, and they very quickly run afoul of District 13's draconian rules and end up cruelly punished for stealing bread. Katniss orders them set free and healed. Venia is said to have always been the strongest: for example, in Catching Fire, Venia is the only one to contain her emotions while working on Katniss's appearance, while Octavia and Flavius both need to leave the room to control their emotions. Katniss's prep team only appears in the first two films (except for Venia, who only appears in the first); their roles in the final two films are filled by Effie.

Caesar Flickerman 
Caesar Flickerman is the Master of Ceremonies and commentator for the Hunger Games, along with Claudius Templesmith. He has served as the master of ceremonies since the 50th Hunger Games, but his unchanged appearance leads Katniss to speculate that he had received extensive surgeries to retain his youth. He also interviews each tribute on live television the night before the Games begin and is known to have an innate ability to relax a tribute's fears to have a casual discussion with him or her. He is also known for wearing a different color of hair and suit for each Hunger Game, including a frightening blood-red color of hair used in the 73rd Hunger Games. In the movies, he is also known for flashing a huge smile. He also interviews Peeta after the events of the 75th Hunger Games in Mockingjay. It is implied that he is the son or grandson of the first Hunger Games commentator, Lucky Flickerman.

Snow 
Tigris Snow is a former Hunger Games stylist who later works in a small shop specializing in fur-trimmed underwear in the Capitol. Her face has been altered into a "semi-feline mask" through many surgical operations. It is implied these alterations, too strange for even people in The Capitol, caused her to be shunned and banned as a stylist for the Games; this resulted in Tigris's becoming embittered towards The Capitol. She aids Katniss's squad on their final mission by hiding them in her shop and disguising them. When Katniss offers Tigris food, she says: "I eat next to nothing, and then, only raw meat". After that, Katniss says that Tigris is too into her character. 

In The Ballad of Songbirds and Snakes, she is revealed as Coriolanus Snow's cousin, three years his senior. She cooks for him and their grandmother as she is the only member. In this book, she is training to be a fashion designer, and she and Coriolanus are shown to care deeply for each other.

Volumnia Gaul 
Dr. Volumnia Gaul is a sadistic and whimsical mad scientist who is the indirect creator of the Hunger Games. She is the initial Head Gamemaker of the 10th Hunger Games. She developed the Hunger Games from an assignment done by two of her university students before the war, Crassus Snow and Casca Highbottom. She views the Games as a way to represent the lack of control and order without the Capitol in a Hobbesian fashion. She is also head of the Capitol's Experimental Weapons Division, creating many mutations as part of her job, and a professor of military theory at the University. In The Ballad of Songbirds and Snakes, she behaves eccentrically and sadistically places mentors in dangerous situations. She specifically takes a particular liking to Coriolanus Snow, due to his ideas for the Games and thoughts on control and order. Eventually, she has him honorably discharged from the Peacekeepers, enrolls him at the University, and even makes him an intern for the Gamemakers.

Casca Highbottom 
Casca Highbottom is the headmaster of the Academy, the most prestigious high school in Panem, and publicly credited as the creator of the Hunger Games. While attending University, Crassus Snow got him drunk during an assignment to get him to give him all his ideas, this assignment later morphed into the Hunger Games. Traumatized by this, he became a morphing addict, leading to a young Coriolanus Snow to mockingly call him "High-as-a-kiteBottom" behind his back. He never forgave Crassus for what he did so he made his son, Coriolanus, the mentor for Lucy Gray Bard out of revenge. Eventually he proves Snow cheated in the Games and forces him to join the Peacekeepers as punishment. When Snow becomes a student at the University, he becomes Snow's first victim to die from his signature weapon of poison.

Minor Capitol characters 
Claudius Templesmith is an announcer and commentator for the Hunger Games with Caesar Flickerman.
Portia is Peeta's stylist in the 74th and 75th Hunger Games. She is only mentioned a few times in the series. She praises Katniss on a job well done in the first book, when Katniss receives an 11 in her private session. Alongside the other stylists and prep teams for other tributes (except for Katniss's prep team), Portia is publicly executed by the Capitol after the Third Quarter Quell due to their alleged collaboration with the tributes that facilitates their escape from the arena.
Atala is the training center coach before the Games.
Cressida is the resident director from the Capitol. She and her camera crew join the rebellion, moving to District 13 after fleeing the Capitol. Cressida is described as "a woman with a shaved head tattooed with green vines". She films propos for District 13 and later accompanies Katniss and her squad during their assault on the Capitol. She becomes upset by the deaths of two of her crew members, Castor and Messalla, but survives the war and begins filming the war destruction in Panem alongside Pollux.
Messalla is Cressida's assistant from the Capitol. He moved to District 13 after fleeing the Capitol. He assists in filming propos for the rebels in Districts 8 and 13. He joins the Star Squad in the rebellion, on their final mission in the Capitol. When the troops find their way into the Capitol's underground, they are soon found by lizard mutations. While fleeing from the lizards, Messalla is killed by a pod that emits a shaft of impenetrable light, melting his skin off.
Castor and Pollux are brothers who comprise Cressida's camera crew from the Capitol. They often wear "insect shells", that is, a wearable carapace holding the camera and equipment. Pollux is a former Avox, having escaped from servitude in the Capitol, and Castor interprets for him. As photojournalists, they are courageous and have an incredible sense for "capturing the right moment" on film. After Katniss sings "The Hanging Tree", Pollux comes to truly accept and admire her. Castor is killed by the lizard mutations, with Finnick and Homes, while Pollux survives and assists Cressida to document the war destruction after the war's end. The brothers' names derive from the twins of Greek mythology. In the myth, as in Mockingjay, Castor is killed, while Pollux lives on, alone.
Fulvia Cardew is Plutarch Heavensbee's assistant who defects from the Capitol to join the Second Rebellion. Gale notes that she is "so well intended, yet so insulting". She proposes that Katniss would become the center of the propos by reading out speeches written by her, which Katniss vehemently rejects because she does not want to become anyone other than herself. Later, Fulvia suggests for a propo about the fallen tributes with Finnick narrating; this time, her idea is green-lit. Fulvia survives the Second Rebellion and continues to assist Plutarch. In the films, Fulvia does not appear, her role instead being taken by Effie.

Crassus Xanthos Snow is Coriolanus Snow's father. He died during the First Rebellion. He co-created the idea of the Hunger Games with his friend Casca Highbottom as part of a university assignment.

District 8 
Commander Paylor first appears in Mockingjay. Paylor is described as having dark brown eyes that are puffy with fatigue, and she smells of metal and sweat. Paylor is the leader of the rebel troops in District 8. Katniss meets her while in District 8 to film a propo. Later in Mockingjay, while wandering around President Snow's now rebel-inhabited mansion, Paylor allows Katniss to see President Snow, who is now imprisoned and awaiting execution. Two days after Katniss kills Coin, Paylor becomes President of Panem. It is implied that living conditions in all the districts improved considerably under her presidency.
Bonnie and Twill meet Katniss in the woods during Catching Fire. Both are from District 8 and are rebels. Twill proves this by holding out a cracker with the image of a mockingjay; in the book, it is the first time Katniss sees that the mockingjay has become a symbol of rebellion. Bonnie and Twill are on their way to District 13, and are the first to tell Katniss that District 13 may exist. Katniss also begins to ponder the reality of District 13, when she realizes that they show the same footage of the burned-down justice building again and again, each time implying it is current footage. However, in Mockingjay, it is mentioned the pair never made it to 13, and they are presumed dead. Bonnie and Twill are not featured in the films.
Eddy is a boy who is hospitalized along with his sister in District 8 by the time Katniss arrives there to film a propo. He seems to idolize Katniss with how he tries to come close to see her. He and his sister presumably perish when the Capitol bombs the hospital they are in.

District 12

Katniss's mother 
Katniss's mother, Mrs. Everdeen, has fair skin, blonde hair, and blue eyes, which symbolize that she is not from the seam. She was raised in town as the daughter of an apothecary and consequently had a fairly comfortable life. During the 50th Hunger Games (2nd Quarter Quell) reaping, she and Madge's mother were clinging on Maysilee Donner, Madge's aunt, and Ms. Everdeen's friend, who was reaped and killed at the time. She gave it all up to marry Katniss's father and move to the Seam, where she lived in poverty. After her husband died in a mining accident, she fell into a deep depression and did not speak for a long time, neglecting her daughters and forcing Katniss to become Prim's primary parent figure. Mrs. Everdeen eventually recovered enough to set up an apothecary in District 12, but it was not until after Katniss's first Hunger Games that she finally forgave her mother for not offering any support to her and Prim during her depression. In Mockingjay, Mrs. Everdeen is seen working in the hospital in District 13, and following Prim's death at the end of the book, she does not return to District 12 with Katniss. Instead, she stays in District 4, working in a hospital and coping with her grief. She and Katniss maintain contact through telephone calls.

Katniss's father 
Katniss's father, Mr. Everdeen, died in the District 12 mines with Gale's father, when Katniss was 11 and Prim was 7. Memories of him run through Katniss' mind throughout the series, with Katniss mentioning his singing voice, his handsomeness, and the things he taught her. Peeta's father says that although he was in love with Katniss's mother, she chose to marry Katniss's father because of his lovely singing voice. Katniss recalls that when her father sang, "all the birds stopped to listen" (this is one of the memories that Peeta responds successfully to). Katniss misses her father terribly, and the pain of losing him almost destroyed Mrs. Everdeen. He is depicted through flashbacks in the films.

Madge Undersee 
Madge Undersee is the mayor's daughter and Katniss's friend. She is not included in the film adaptations. She is described as having blonde hair and blue eyes, similar to the other merchant kids such as Peeta and Delly Cartwright. She and Katniss were always thrown together at school in the books, as both were solitary in nature. Madge gives Katniss her mockingjay pin, which becomes a symbol of rebellion. In the film, Katniss obtains the pin at the market from Greasy Sae, who lets her take it free of charge. Katniss later learns the pin belonged to Madge's aunt, Maysilee Donner, a tribute in the 50th Hunger Games, and Madge's aunt, who was also friends with Katniss's mother, who became Haymitch's ally and was killed by candy-pink birds with spear beaks. Katniss and Madge spend more time together during the months after the Games. Katniss finds out that Madge doesn't see her parents often; her father has to run District 12 and her mother suffers from severe headaches that cause her to stay in bed.  Katniss and Madge frequently went over to each other's houses, particularly during Catching Fire. Madge tried to teach Katniss to play the piano, but Katniss preferred to listen to her play. Madge wanted to go out into the woods to hunt, so Katniss took her and showed her how to shoot. Katniss is at Madge's house when she first hears of the uprisings in District 8 on the mayor's television in his room. Madge and her family perish in the District 12 bombings, and Katniss is very sorrowful at Madge's death and recalls how brave and kind she was.

Delly Cartwright 
Delly Cartwright is a girl from District 12 whom Katniss describes as being "the friendliest person on the planet". Delly is Peeta's friend and became one of the refugees in District 13, after escaping the District 12 fire bombing with her younger brother. Her parents, who hid in the shoe shop during the bombing, were not so lucky, as Katniss describes. Delly is first mentioned in The Hunger Games, when Peeta, trying to explain Katniss's reaction upon recognizing an Avox as someone she met on a hunting trip, fibs that the Avox is a "dead ringer for Delly". In Mockingjay, after Peeta is rescued from the Capitol, Delly is used as a psychological "balm" to stir his childhood memories and help begin his recovery from the mind-control tortures the Capitol inflicted upon him. In the same book, it was revealed that Delly and Peeta used to create chalk drawings on paving stones, and Peeta's father used to let them make dough people. Delly does not appear in the film series, her role instead being taken by Prim.

Greasy Sae 
Greasy Sae is an old woman who sells bowls of soup from a large kettle at The Hob in District 12. Katniss Everdeen and Gale Hawthorne trade with her often, and make a conscious effort to remain on good terms with her, as she could be counted on to buy wild dogs, which most of their other customers decline. Greasy Sae started a collection to sponsor Peeta and Katniss during the 74th Hunger Games, and some people chipped in. She has a granddaughter described as "not quite right" (this probably refers to her having a mental disorder) who is generally treated as a pet by people in The Hob, who give her scraps of food from their stands. At the end of the book, Greasy Sae is one of the few hundred people to return to District 12 following the war, as her granddaughter was said to have perished during the bombing of District 12. When Katniss returns to District 12 after the war, Greasy Sae comes over in the morning and evening to cook and do light housekeeping. It is unclear whether she is doing this out of friendship or if she has been paid. Greasy Sae is not directly mentioned in the Hunger Games movies, but is a character who is presumably seen dealing with Katniss; she gives the Mockingjay pin to Katniss in the film although in the book Madge gave Katniss the pin.

Buttercup 
Buttercup is Prim's cat. Though Katniss describes him as "the world's ugliest cat", Prim disregards this and takes good care of him. He is Prim's companion and is loyal only to her. Although he did not escape with Prim and Mrs. Everdeen, Katniss found him when she visited District 12 after the bombings and brought him back. He is said to dislike District 13, due to its underground location and lack of fresh air. After Prim's death and the end of the war, he makes his way back to District 12 on foot and is found again by Katniss. The two mourn Prim's death in Mockingjay and end up comforting each other (it is hinted they are beginning to love each other). Buttercup has black and white fur in the first film (contrary to his name), but in later films better fits the books' description of him.

Minor District 12 characters 
Hazelle Hawthorne is Gale's mother. A very self-reliant woman, after her husband is killed in the same mining accident that killed Katniss's father, she takes up work doing people's laundry. In the book, after Gale is caught poaching and is publicly whipped, people stop using Hazelle's services for fear of being punished for associating with her. She gets a new job cleaning Haymitch's house sometime after that.
Rory, Vick, and Posy Hawthorne are Gale's younger siblings. The book states Rory is 12, Vick is 10, and Posy is 5. Posy was born after the mining accident that killed Gale and Katniss's fathers. After Thread's lockdown, Posy got sick, and Rory received tesserae in exchange for his name to be entered more times in the reaping. In the final book, Posy cheers up Octavia, saying that she would pretty in any color.
Mr. Mellark is Peeta's father. He owns a bakery. Kind and soft-spoken, he resembles his son. He does not appear except when he trades with Katniss and Gale, and when he visits Katniss before the 74th Hunger Games to give her cookies. It is later revealed that he grew up with Katniss's mother, Mrs. Everdeen, and even loved her. In Mockingjay, it is revealed that he used to let Peeta and Delly Cartwright make dough girls and boys. Mr. Mellark and his wife die in the District 12 bombings.
Mrs. Mellark is Peeta's mother. Very stern and strict, she only appears in the series once, when she beats Peeta. Peeta mentions that he likes his father more than his mother. Katniss calls her a "witch" on several occasions and hints that Mr. Mellark only married her because he could not have the woman who became Mrs. Everdeen. Mrs. Mellark dies in the District 12 bombings.
Cray is the Head Peacekeeper of District 12. As such Cray does not enforce many of the laws of the Capitol. He is often found in The Hob, District 12's black market, where he buys illegal alcohol and game from Gale and Katniss. Although lenient with the law, he is also known to abuse his position by luring starving young women into his bed in exchange for a small amount of money. He disappears abruptly the day Thread comes to take his place and there is no further word of his fate. In the movie he is seen stepping out to greet Thread right before having a bag placed over his head and being taken away by peacekeepers suggesting he met a bad end.
Romulus Thread is Cray's replacement as Head Peacekeeper of District 12. He is extremely cruel, intimidating and sadistic. His only appearance is in the second book Catching Fire at Gale Hawthorne's whipping for poaching off the Capitol's land. The film changes his reason for whipping Gale to because he tackles him when he is about to beat a defiant bystander. Thread makes major changes to District 12 by adding new gallows, stocks, and a whipping post, as well as enforcing curfew. He also has The Hob (District 12's black market) burned down.
Mayor Undersee is Madge Undersee's father as well as District 12's mayor. He enjoys the strawberries that Katniss Everdeen and Gale Hawthorne pick illegally from the woods. He was present at the reaping in The Hunger Games. He is also mentioned as throwing a Harvest Festival party in District 12 in Catching Fire. He dies in the District 12 bombing.
Goat Man is an old man who raises goats for a living. In The Hunger Games, Katniss recalls him as the man who sells Katniss and Gale a goat. Later, the goat is given to Primrose and named Lady. Goat Man is said to have died during the initial bombing of District 12.
Rooba is the District 12 butcher. She helps Katniss by refusing the Goat Man's offer, thus letting Katniss have the goat for a lower price. She is also known to buy meat (such as rabbits and deer) from Katniss and Gale. She dies in the District 12 bombing.
Ripper is a seller of white liquor in the Hob market of District 12. Peeta threatens to report her to the Peacekeepers if she continues to sell liquor to Katniss and Haymitch, who drink together after the twist for the Third Quarter Quell is revealed. She presumably dies during the District 12 bombings, as she is not mentioned among the 10% of the population who manage to reach District 13.
Lady is a nanny goat owned by Prim, who usually milks it before going to school every day. Lady was not brought to District 13 (and neither was Buttercup) during the evacuation. Her fate is not confirmed, but Katniss did not see her anywhere when she visited District 12 after the bombings.
Mrs. Undersee is Mayor Undersee's wife, Madge's mother, and Maysilee Donner's sister. She is said to have been in a very deep depression, partially brought on by her sister's death. She is described as staying in bed all day, shutting away reality. She takes pills to calm her pain, which does not seem to work. She perishes along with her daughter, husband, and two other people in the District 12 bombings.
Darius is a friendly Peacekeeper who became an Avox because he interfered with Gale's public whipping. He is Katniss's Avox servant for the Quarter Quell, along with Lavinia. Because of this, he was arrested with Lavinia, questioned about Katniss, tortured, and eventually killed. Peeta mentioned in Mockingjay that while Lavinia died relatively quickly (if accidentally), it took days to finish Darius off. As Avoxes cannot speak, it can be assumed the only purpose for questioning them was to torture Peeta by making him listen. Darius does not appear in the film series.
Leevy is Katniss' neighbor, who makes her first canon-appearance in Catching Fire. She offers to help after Gale's whipping, and Katniss tells her to go to the Hawthorne house. She survived the bombing of District 12. She is shown in District 13 in Mockingjay as being cautious of Katniss' prep team, but still gives them a greeting. She is supportive of Katniss, and she tells Haymitch that she was inspired by Katniss' drive when she volunteered for Prim at the reaping. It can be assumed that she survived the rebellion, and most likely returned to District 12. She is described as being from the Seam, so she likely has dark hair and gray eyes, and is likely the same age as Katniss. When Leevy goes to get Hazelle Hawthorne after Gale's whipping, Katniss reminds her to leave Rory, Vick, and Posy at their house so that they couldn't see the pain that their older brother was in.

District 13

President Coin 
President Alma Coin is the leader of District 13. She is described as having gray hair that falls in an unbroken sheet to her shoulders and gray eyes that look like "all the color was sucked away" and "slush that you wish would melt away". She has a special dislike of Katniss and mentions that Katniss is more useful to her dead than alive. It is also revealed that she wanted Peeta rescued from the Third Quarter Quell, not Katniss. During the assault on Capitol, Coin deliberately places Peeta in Katniss's squad to endanger Katniss's life, which Snow had warned about for he and Coin had been political rivals. After taking over the Capitol, Alma becomes the "interim" president of Panem and proposes a final Hunger Games with the Capitol children as tributes. She is publicly killed by Katniss at President Snow's execution after Katniss concludes that Coin was responsible for the bombing that proved fatal to Primrose and many Capitol children.

Boggs 
Boggs is first introduced as President Coin's right-hand man. At first, Katniss writes him off as someone she will dislike due to his close association with Coin. However, he is shown to be honest, witty, and friendly, and Katniss learns to trust him. He serves as Katniss' bodyguard for part of Mockingjay and is assigned to Squad 451 along with Katniss, Gale, and Finnick. He accidentally steps on a land mine on a Capitol street that the Holo did not detect. When his legs are blown off, the squad drags him into an apartment, where he gives Katniss his Holo and tells her to complete her "mission", to not trust "them" (whom this is referring to is unclear), and to kill Peeta. He dies soon afterward.

Minor District 13 characters 
Leeg 1 and Leeg 2 are sisters who were born in District 13 and placed in the sharpshooting Star Squad to assist Katniss in her final mission. They are said to look almost completely alike. Since everyone is addressed as "Soldier", they are distinguished by 1 and 2. Four days after arriving in the Capitol, Leeg 2 is the first to be killed in the Star Squad. She dies after a metal dart, shot out of an incorrectly labelled pod, hits her in the temple. Leeg 1 continues through to the Capitol's underground until she is killed when Katniss discovers that Leeg 1 and Jackson chose to stay at a pod called the Meat Grinder, to hold back the lizard mutations. In the films, their deaths are modified; the two die together after Leeg 1 chooses to stay with Leeg 2, who is injured in a landmine trap, as the building they are in is destroyed by the Peacekeepers.
Mitchell, Jackson, and Homes are part of Katniss's sharpshooting team, the Star Squad; they are all killed in the war. Mitchell is kicked into a net of barbed wire by a raging Peeta and subsequently killed by a black tar-like substance. Jackson, second in command after Boggs in the Star Squad, stays behind to hold back the mutations, along with Leeg 1, presumably resulting in their deaths. Homes is presumed to have been decapitated by the lizard mutations, along with Finnick and Castor.
Dr. Aurelius is a doctor from District 13. He takes care of Katniss during her time in District 13 and heads the study on Peeta's hijacking. He is also Katniss's doctor/therapist after Prim's death (however, he generally sleeps during their sessions unless she feels like talking, which suits them both). He serves as a witness in Katniss's defense during her trial for the killing of Coin and states Katniss is mentally unstable. Dr. Aurelius does not appear in the film series.
Dalton is a man from District 10 who made it to District 13 on foot years before the series takes place. He makes his first appearance in Mockingjay in District 13. He conducts Annie and Finnick's wedding because it was close to the ceremony that is in his district.

References

 
Lists of literary characters
Lists of film characters